Mirabel Osler (1925 - 2016) was an English writer and garden designer.  Her book A Gentle Plea for Chaos, based on her experiences in her garden in Shropshire, was said to send "a blast of fresh air through the stuffy rooms of the English gardening world when it was first published."

Biography
Mirabel was born Mirabel E E Birnstingl in 1925 in London.  She was the daughter of Harry Joseph Birnstingl and Phyllis Taylor Reid.  Her stepfather was the author and journalist Aylmer Vallance. She married Michael Julian Osler on 5 April 1951 and they lived in Thailand and Corfu before returning to England to live in Shropshire. Michael died on 26 April 1989. They had one son and two daughters (the youngest, Sureen, was adopted).

She wrote regularly for the garden magazine Hortus.

She died in Hereford County Hospital on 20 October 2016 aged 91.

Awards 
 Mirabel won the Sinclair Consumer Press Garden Writer of the Year Award in 1988.
 Mirabel won the Journalist of the Year Award from the Garden Writers Guild in 2003

Bibliography
Osler, M.; A Gentle Plea for Chaos: the Enchantment of Gardening 1989, New York City: Simon & Schuster 
—, The Garden Bench 1991, New York City: Simon & Schuster 
—, In the Eye of the Garden 1993, London: Weidenfeld & Nicolson 
—, The Garden Wall 1993, New York City: Simon & Schuster
—, A spoon with every course: in search of the legendary food of France 1996, London: Pavilion 
—, A Breath From Elsewhere: Musings on Gardens 1998, London: Bloomsbury 
—, The Elusive Truffle: Travels in Search of the Legendary Food of France 2000, London: Black Swan 
—, The Rain Tree: A Memoir 2011, London: Bloomsbury

References

External links
 A Twice-Told Tale

1925 births
2016 deaths
English garden writers
English women non-fiction writers
English memoirists
British women memoirists
20th-century English women writers
20th-century English writers
21st-century English women writers